Katinka Heyns (born September 20, 1947) is a South African actress, director and filmmaker in the South African film industry. She is known for including feminist perspectives in her films, as well as commenting on South African politics and culture. Her work includes the film Paljas which was selected as the South African entry, but not nominated, for Best Foreign Language Film at the 70th Academy Awards.

Biography
Katinka Heyns was born on September 20, 1947. She attended the University of Pretoria in South Africa and graduated with a Bachelor of Arts degree, majoring in drama. Heyns was married to writer Chris Barnard, with whom she has a son, Simon Barnard.

Career
She began her career as an actor playing a part in Jans Rautenbach's Katrina (1969). She went on to be cast in several of Rautenbach's films, including Janie Totsiens (1970), Pappa Lap (1971), and Eendag op 'n Reendag (1975). She also received a lot of attention for her role in Manie van Rensburg's television comedy series Willem.

Due to the apartheid policy in South Africa at the time, there were severe censorship laws in place, however Heyns was still able to make documentaries about various literary individuals. Heyns founded the production company Sonneblom Films in 1974. It was through this company she was able to create feature films unique to her particular style. All the scripts for her feature films were written by her husband Chris Barnard. Her feature films include: Fiela se Kind (1987), Die Storie van Klara Viljee (1991), Paljas (1997), and Die Wonderwerker (2012).

Film style
Heyns has been influenced heavily by filmmaker Jans Rautenbach who gave her a start for her career in film. In an industry dominated by male filmmakers, Heyns consistently creates films that focus on female empowerment and specifically female experiences. Keyan G. Tomaselli, a professor at the University of KwaZulu-Natal notes how Heyns' films are able to comment on the political climate in South Africa, by applying a feminist lens. Her films attempt to portray political and cultural experiences that are specific to South Africa, while other directors of her time focused on reproducing American style films. All of Heyns' pieces evoke themes of relationships, love, and struggle, while simultaneously questioning gender representations in South African culture. Through her films, Heyns tries to bring lesser known issues and ideas into the global conversation, such as mental illness and female empowerment, while consistently doing so in the context of South African culture.

Filmography

Awards and nominations
 The film Eendag op 'n Reendag (1975) won the Rapport Oscar for Best Actress 
 The South African Academy of Arts and Science Medal of Honour. 
 Received the Legendary Award for Women in Film and Television at the International Crystal Awards. 
 Honorary doctorate from the University of Pretoria, for her contributions to dramatic arts.  
 Selected to be the South African entry for an Academy Award for the category of Best Foreign Language Film for her film Paljas (1997). Eventually it was not nominated for the award. It was the first time a South African film had been entered in such a division.

References

1947 births
Living people
Feminist filmmakers
Place of birth missing (living people)
South African film actresses
South African film directors
University of Pretoria alumni